Indiana State Normal School may refer to former names of:
Indiana State University from 1865 to 1929
Indiana University of Pennsylvania from 1920 to 1927